Moldova (officially the Republic of Moldova) competed at the 2012 Summer Olympics in London, from 27 July to 12 August 2012. This was the nation's fifth consecutive appearance at the Summer Olympics in the post-Soviet era.

Moldova sent its smallest delegation to the Games. A total of 22 athletes, 12 men and 10 women, competed in 9 sports. This was also the youngest delegation in Moldova's summer Olympic history, with more than half under the age of 25, and many of them were expected to reach their peak in time for the 2016 Olympics in Rio de Janeiro. Marathon runner Iaroslav Musinschi, who participated as a steeplechaser in the Olympics since 2000, was at his third appearance as the most experienced member. Fourteen Moldovan athletes had competed at their first Olympics, including 15-year-old archer Dan Olaru, the youngest member of the team, who became the nation's flag bearer at the opening ceremony.

Moldova originally left London with two bronze medals, tying its overall record for the most medals with Atlanta and Sydney at a single Olympics. These medals were all won by weightlifters Cristina Iovu and Anatolie Cîrîcu. However, both athletes were disqualified due to positive cases of doping, and Moldova was stripped of both medals and failed to win any medals overall.

Archery

Moldova qualified the following archers.

Athletics

Moldovan athletes achieved qualifying standards in the following athletics events (up to a maximum of 3 athletes in each event at the 'A' Standard, and 1 at the 'B' Standard):

Key
 Note – Ranks given for track events are within the athlete's heat only
 Q = Qualified for the next round
 q = Qualified for the next round as a fastest loser or, in field events, by position without achieving the qualifying target
 NR = National record
 N/A = Round not applicable for the event
 Bye = Athlete not required to compete in round

Men
Track & road events

Field events

Women
Track & road events

Field events

Boxing

Moldova has so far qualified boxers for the following events:
Men

Cycling

Road

Judo

Moldova qualified 2 judokas

Shooting

Women

Swimming

Men

Women

Weightlifting

Moldova qualified the following quota places.

Wrestling

Moldova qualified two quotas.

Key
  - Victory by Fall.
  - Decision by Points - the loser with technical points.
  - Decision by Points - the loser without technical points.

Men's freestyle

Women's freestyle

References

External links

Nations at the 2012 Summer Olympics
2012
2012 in Moldovan sport